La Dhuys is a future station on line 11 of the Paris Métro. The station is situated on the communes of Montreuil and Rosny-sous-Bois and slated to open in 2023.

Paris Métro line 11
Paris Métro stations in Montreuil, Seine-Saint-Denis
Future Paris Métro stations
Railway stations scheduled to open in 2023